Dame Margaret Janson Tuke  (13 March 1862, Hitchin, Hertfordshire, England21 February 1947, Hitchin) was a British academic and educator. She was the youngest child of the philanthropist James Hack Tuke. She was created a Dame Commander of the Order of the British Empire in 1932.

Education
Tuke was educated at home until she was 15, then for two years at St John's School in Withdean, now part of Brighton. She also went to Bedford College in London one day a week in Michaelmas term 1879.

In 1885 she became one of the first women to go up to Cambridge University, where she read Modern and Medieval Languages at Newnham, gaining the equivalent of a first class honours degree in 1888. As women were not awarded degrees by Cambridge at the time, her BA and MA were conferred upon her by Trinity College, Dublin in 1905. (Women could only receive Cambridge degrees after 1948.)

Career
Tuke began her academic career at Newnham College and taught French there, as a staff lecturer in modern languages, from 1890 to 1905. She then moved to University College, Bristol, to take up the position of tutor to the women students and a lectureship in French. She remained a Fellow of Newnham from 1905 until 1936.

Tuke became Principal of Bedford College in 1907 and remained in the post until her retirement in 1929. During her time there she oversaw its move from Baker Street, London, to a site at Regent's Park, after which the number of students doubled. While overseeing the expansion of the academic provisions at the College, she also served as the representative of the Faculty of Arts on the University of London Senate from 1911 until her retirement. Additionally, she served on numerous academic committees, including the University Scholarships Committee and the Academic Council (1911–1929).

In September 1937 Dame Margaret presented the Library of Royal Holloway, University of London with a collection of Italian Renaissance letters dating from 1526–1697. They deal principally with the family and business affairs of the Florentine Ridolfi family. The Tuke manuscript collection enhanced the research potential of existing works of Italian literature ranging from the 16th to 20th century, of which Giovanni Battista Guarini's Poetical Works (1630) and Gian Giorgio Trissino's La Sophonisba (1530) are examples in the collection.

Personal life
Tuke shared interweaving, intimate relationships with other female writers. She annually shared a rented summer home with Caroline Spurgeon, Virginia Gildersleeve and others. She was known by the nickname of "Meta".

Legacy
In 1949, Bedford College established the Dame Margaret Tuke Travel Bursary to commemorate the life and work of Dame Margaret Tuke. This is still awarded bi-annually.

Royal Holloway (merged with Bedford College in 1985) named one of its student accommodation buildings after Tuke.

Bibliography
"Women students in the universities" (Contemporary Review, 1928, 71–77)
A History of Bedford College for women 1849-1937 (Oxford University Press, 1939)

References

See also
Tuke family

1862 births
1947 deaths
Dames Commander of the Order of the British Empire
English lesbian writers
Fellows of Newnham College, Cambridge
Margaret
Alumni of Bedford College, London
Alumni of Newnham College, Cambridge
Steamboat ladies